Zettagrid is a  Cloud computing and Telecommunications aggregator and distributor in the Asia Pacific Region offering infrastructure as a service (IaaS), Backup (BaaS), Disaster Recovery (DRaaS), Software Licensing, Ethernet, MPLS, SD-WAN and Voice services to IT Resellers and Managed Service Providers. The company is headquartered in Perth, Western Australia with offices in Sydney, Melbourne, Singapore and Jakarta.


Availability Zones

Australia
Adelaide, Brisbane, Perth, Melbourne, Sydney

Indonesia
Jakarta, Cibitung

Singapore
Singapore

History 
Zettagrid launched in May 2010 offering VMware vSphere virtual private server hosting from Perth, Western Australia. In July 2011 Zettagrid launched a virtual data centre service based upon VMware vCloud.

In November 2019, Zettagrid opens new availability zones in Singapore, Adelaide and Brisbane.
In January 2019, Zettagrid acquires the Perth based cloud provider Silverain Technology.
In November 2018, Zettagrid opens a fifth availability zone in Cibitung, Indonesia.
In October 2017, Zettagrid opens a fourth availability zone in Jakarta, Indonesia. 
In April 2016, Zettagrid acquires the Sydney based cloud provider Conexim.
In November 2012, Zettagrid opens a third availability zone in Melbourne, Victoria. 
In September 2011, Zettagrid expands by establishing a second availability zone in Sydney, New South Wales. 
In May 2010, Zettagrid opens their first availability zone in Perth, Western Australia.

Awards 
 Zettagrid Disaster Recovery product SecondSite™ awarded Continuity and Resilience Provider (Service or Product) at the 2017 Business Continuity Institute Awards Australasia.
 Zettagrid Awarded Zerto Cloud Partner of the Year APJ 2017
 On 20 March 2015, Zettagrid was awarded the Veeam Cloud Provider Partner of the Year
 On 15 February 2015, Zettagrid was accepted into Australian Federal Governments Whole-of-Government Cloud Services Panel.
 In July 2012, Zettagrid was awarded Veeam ProPartner of the Year.
 In October 2012, Zettagrid was appointed to Australian Federal Government Data Centre as a Service (DCaaS) Multi Use List
 Zettagrid is Australia's first VMware vCloud Powered Service Provider.
 Zettagrid is nominated at VMware PEX 2013 for ANZ Service Provider Partner of the Year.

Competitors
Amazon Web Services, OVH, LeaseWeb, Iland, phoenixNAP, Microsoft Azure, Macquarie Telecom, Telstra, Optus

References

External links 

Computer companies established in 2010
Companies based in Perth, Western Australia
Web hosting
Cloud computing providers
Australian companies established in 2010